The 1999 season of the Torneo Descentralizado was the 84th season of the top category of Peruvian football (soccer). It was played by 12 teams. The national champion was Universitario.

The national championship was divided into two half-year tournaments, the Torneo Apertura and the Torneo Clausura. Each was played on a home-and-away round-robin basis. The winners of each would play for the national title in a playoff. If the same club had won both tournaments, it would have won the national championship automatically.

Following-season Copa Libertadores berths went to the champion, as well as to the best other team in the aggregate table. The bottom team on the aggregate table was relegated, while the eleventh place held a promotion play-off against the winner of the Segunda División (Second Division).

Teams

Torneo Apertura

Torneo Clausura

Season finals

Title

Aggregate table

Promotion play-off

Top scorers 
32 goals
 Ysrael Zúñiga (FBC Melgar)
24 goals
 Harry Castillo (Unión Minas)
22 goals
 Waldir Sáenz (Alianza Lima)
19 goals
 Roberto Holsen (Alianza Atlético, Sporting Cristal)
 Claudio Pizarro (Alianza Lima)

External links 
 Peru 1999 season Details on RSSSF

Peruvian Primera División seasons
Peru
Torneo Descentralizado